Over the Moon is a 1939 British Technicolor comedy film directed by Thornton Freeland and starring Merle Oberon, Rex Harrison, Ursula Jeans and Herbert Lomas.

Plot summary

Jane Benson (Merle Oberon) is a lowly Yorkshire girl who lives simply, caring for her elderly, ailing uncle and not wishing for anything more. She does take a fancy, however, to the local doctor, Freddie Jarvis (Rex Harrison), and she persuades him to marry her. Soon she finds she has inherited eighteen million pounds and wants to travel across Europe with Freddie Jarvis; however he wants to stay as he is dedicated to his patients. So she leaves for Europe without him and is followed by suitors who are not necessarily interested in her personality. Meanwhile, back in Yorkshire, Dr Jarvis becomes notorious as the man who turned down £18 million and the infamy seriously affects his ability for serious research.

Cast
 Merle Oberon as Jane Benson
 Rex Harrison as Dr. Freddie Jarvis
 Ursula Jeans as Millie
 Robert Douglas as John Flight (credited as playing The Unknown Man)
 Louis Borel as Pietro (credited as Louis Borrell)
 Zena Dare as Julie
 Peter Haddon as Lord Petcliffe
 David Tree as Journalist
 Mackenzie Ward as Guy
 Elisabeth Welch as Cabaret Singer
 Carl Jaffe as Michel
 Herbert Lomas as Ladbrooke
 Wilfred Shine as Frude
 Gerald Nodin as Cartwright
 Evelyn Ankers as Patient (uncredited)
 Ethel Griffies as Miss Bates (uncredited)
 Wilfrid Hyde-White as Dwight, the Sanitarium Spokesman (uncredited)
 Andreas Malandrinos as Father on Train (uncredited)

References

External links
 
 
 
 

1939 films
1930s color films
1939 comedy films
Films set in Yorkshire
Films directed by Thornton Freeland
British comedy films
Films directed by William K. Howard
Films produced by Alexander Korda
1930s English-language films
1930s British films